Christoph Etzlstorfer (born 1963) is an Austrian who has competed in the Paralympics since 1984. He has won eight medals, including a gold at the 2004 Summer Paralympics.

References

External links 
Homepage of Christoph Etzlstorfer

Athletes (track and field) at the 1984 Summer Paralympics
Athletes (track and field) at the 1988 Summer Paralympics
Athletes (track and field) at the 1992 Summer Paralympics
Athletes (track and field) at the 2000 Summer Paralympics
Cyclists at the 2004 Summer Paralympics
Paralympic gold medalists for Austria
Paralympic silver medalists for Austria
Paralympic bronze medalists for Austria
Paralympic cyclists of Austria
1963 births
Living people
Medalists at the 1984 Summer Paralympics
Medalists at the 1988 Summer Paralympics
Medalists at the 1992 Summer Paralympics
Medalists at the 2000 Summer Paralympics
Medalists at the 2004 Summer Paralympics
Austrian male wheelchair racers
Paralympic medalists in athletics (track and field)
Paralympic athletes of Austria